Kiss in the Sky is Misia's fourth studio album and first under Avex Trax subsidiary label Rhythmedia Tribe, released on September 26, 2002. It sold 410,060 copies in its first week and peaked at #1 for two consecutive weeks. Like her previous album, Marvelous, Kiss in the Sky was produced by Misia herself and features collaborations with B'z guitarist and leader, Tak Matsumoto.

Track listing

Kiss in the Sky Kanzenban Limited Edition 

Kiss in the Sky Kanzenban Limited Edition is the limited re-release of Misia's fourth studio album, released on December 4, 2002. The album was re-released as a two-disc set coupling the album with the Back Blocks single due to Misia's wish to include Back Blocks (which was completed after the initial release date) in Kiss in the Sky.

Track listing

Charts

Oricon Sales Chart

Kiss in the Sky

Kiss in the Sky Kanzenban Limited Edition

Physical Sales Charts

Kiss in the Sky

References

External links 
 https://web.archive.org/web/20061117164950/http://www.rhythmedia.co.jp/misia/disc/ — MISIA DISCOGRAPHY

2002 albums
Misia albums
Japanese-language albums